Drug Wars: The Camarena Story is a 1990 TV mini-series that aired on January 7, 8 & 9 1990, based on Elaine Shannon’s book Desperados and the Time magazine article of the same name.  It was directed by Brian Gibson and starred Steven Bauer, Miguel Ferrer, Benicio del Toro, Treat Williams and Craig T. Nelson.  It was the second most watched NBC mini-series of the year following The Kennedys and was followed up in 1992 with Drug Wars: The Cocaine Cartel starring Dennis Farina.

Plot
Fact-based story of undercover DEA agent Enrique Camarena who, while stationed in Guadalajara, uncovered a massive marijuana operation in Northern Mexico that led to his death and a remarkable investigation of corruption within the Mexican government.

Cast

Production
At least four of the principal actors in Drug Wars: The Camarena Story later starred in the Academy Award-winning film Traffic, a film that also deals with the subject of the ongoing drug trade between the United States and Mexico. In a somewhat interesting reversal of roles, in Drug Wars actors Miguel Ferrer and Steven Bauer both play DEA agents while Benicio del Toro and Eddie Velez play drug traffickers; in Traffic, Ferrer and Bauer both play drug traffickers, while del Toro and Velez play a Mexican federal narcotics agent and a DEA agent.

Reception
In his review for The New York Times, John J. O'Connor wrote, "Perhaps not surprisingly, these amoral entrepreneurs provide some of the film's juicier roles. Especially effective is Benicio del Toro as the young, illiterate and flaky Rafael Caro-Quintero". In his review for USA Today, Matt Roush wrote, "For a Michael Mann production, there's surprisingly little flash to Drug Wars. Some interesting camera work to be sure, including the video bits and some heightened use of slow motion, but the miniseries' chief strength is its grit, its anger". Craig MacInnis, in his review for the Toronto Star, wrote, "Interspersed with U.S. network news footage of the real Camarena incident in '85, the dramatic scenes in Drug Wars are never anything less than convincing - just as good propaganda should be".

DVD release
All three parts originally ran for four hours. The current DVD release features a heavily edited version that runs only 130 minutes.

References

External links
 

1990 television films
1990 films
1990s American television miniseries
Primetime Emmy Award for Outstanding Miniseries winners
Primetime Emmy Award-winning television series
NBC network original films
Works about Mexican drug cartels
Television series about organized crime
Films directed by Brian Gibson